Bian is the romanization of several Chinese surnames, including Biàn 卞, Biān 边, Biǎn 扁, Biàn 弁, Biàn 汴, etc. Biān 边 is the most common of these names, while Biàn 卞 is the second-most common.

Notable people named Bian

卞 Biàn
It is the 86th name on the Hundred Family Surnames poem. As of 2018, it is the 269th most common surname in China.
Bian He, discoverer of the Heshibi
Empress Dowager Bian to Cao Cao
Empress Bian to Cao Mao
Empress Bian to Cao Huan
Bian Zhilin, poet in 20th century
Bian Zhongyun, deputy principal beaten to death with wooden sticks by a group of students during Beijing's Red August at the beginning of the Cultural Revolution
Bian Yingui, physicist specializing in fluid mechanics and aerodynamics
Bian Xiaoxuan, historian in Chinese literature
Bian Liunian, Chinese musician, composer, and musical director
Bian Jun, former Chinese international football player
Bian Lan, retired Chinese basketball player
Bian Ka, Chinese shot putter
Bian Chuxian, singer and member of SNH48's Team SII

边 Biān
It is the 313th name on the Hundred Family Surnames poem. As of 2018, it is the 200th most common surname in China.
Bian Zhang, official in the Eastern Han dynasty
Queen Bian, empress of Western Qin
Bian Hao, general of Southern Tang during the Five Dynasties and Ten Kingdoms Period
Bian Jingzhao,  painter in Ming Dynasty
Bian Shoumin,  painter in Qing Dynasty
Bian Jinyang (边金阳; born 1993 in Heilongjiang, China) a Chinese author who published as a child
Bian Jiang, Chinese voice actor
Bian Hongmin, male Chinese volleyball player

扁 Biǎn
Bian Que (real name Qin Yueren 秦越人), earliest known Chinese physician, according to semi-legends

See also
 Bianzhou, old name for Kaifeng

References

Chinese-language surnames
Multiple Chinese surnames